Karongi is a district (akarere) in Western Province, Rwanda. The district's capital is Rubengera. However, it comprises Kibuye, provincial capital, and a major Rwandan lakeside resort.

Tourism 
Tourism is one of the main economic sectors of Karongi. Karongi's location near Lake Kivu, the beautiful scenery and its many islands are the main draws. There are many resort and hotels which have been built recently outside the town of Kibuye, most on the shores of Lake Kivu. One of the most popular islands to visit in Karongi is Napoleon Island; a large island which is popular for hiking and for viewing one of Africa's largest colonies of straw colored fruit bats which resides on the Island. Other islands in Karongi are Monkey Island which has a small population of vervet monkeys and Amahoro or Peace Island which used to have a camping site. 

Night fishing is another popular pastime in Karongi. At night, fishermen sail on three wooden boats bound together by smaller poles and use gas lanterns to lure small Isambaza or Tanganyika sardines into their nets. Some fishermen allow tourists and other visitors to join them on their boats.

Geography 

The district lies on the shores of Lake Kivu, about halfway down the lake between Gisenyi and Cyangugu.

Sectors 
The Karongi district is divided into 13 sectors (imirenge): Bwishyura, Gishyita, Gishari, Gitesi, Mubuga, Murambi, Murundi, Mutuntu, Rubengera, Rugabano, Ruganda, Rwankuba and Twumba.

References 

 
 Inzego.doc — Province, District and Sector information from MINALOC, the Rwanda ministry of local government.
Information about Karongi from the Kivu Belt Destination Management Unit

Districts of Rwanda